The Sedibeng Solar Power Station is an 6.5 MW solar power plant in South Africa. The solar farm is owned by South African independent power producer (IPP), Sola Group (also SOLA Group), headquartered in Cape Town, South Africa. The off-taker of the power generated here is Heineken South Africa, a subsidiary of Heineken N.V., the Dutch beverage conglomerate. The power is used to power manufacturing processes in the Sedibeng Heineken Brewery. A 25-year power purchase agreement (PPA), governs the sale and purchase of electricity between the parties (buyer and seller).

Location
to the Heineken Sedibeng Brewery, in Midvaal Local Municipality, in Sedibeng District Municipality, in the Gauteng Province of South Africa. The geographical coordinates of the solar farm are: 26°25′48″S, 28°03′48″E (Latitude:-26.430000; Longitude:28.063333).

Overview
The design calls for a ground-mounted solar panel power station with 14,000 solar modules mounted on trackers which follow the movement of the sun to maximize power generation. The transmission network of Eskom Holdings is used to convey the power from the power station to the brewery, as is permissible under South African law.

Developers
Sedibeng Solar Power Station is owned and was developed by Solar Group of South Africa. It was commissioned in May 2022, and is operated and maintained by The Sola Group. It has a projected lifespan of 25 years from commercial commissioning.

Other considerations
During the 7 months it took to construct the power station, about 127 jobs were created, of which about 100 were filled by local workers.

See also

List of power stations in South Africa

References

External links
 About Sedibeng SOLA PV Project

Solar power stations in South Africa
Sedibeng District Municipality
Economy of Gauteng
2022 establishments in South Africa
Energy infrastructure completed in 2022
21st-century architecture in South Africa